Fulgham Ridge is a narrow ice-free ridge,  long, forming the southeast side of Bowin Glacier in the Queen Maud Mountains of Antarctica. It was named by the Advisory Committee on Antarctic Names for Aviation Boatswain's Mate Donald R. Fulgham, of the U.S. Navy Antarctic Support Activity, who participated in U.S. Navy Operation Deep Freeze, 1964.

References

Ridges of the Ross Dependency
Dufek Coast